A State of Trance 2004 is the compilation album by Dutch DJ and record producer Armin van Buuren. It was released on 23 March 2004 by Armada Music. It peaked at No.25 on the Billboard Top Dance/Electronic Albums in April 2005.

The record got favorable reviews in PopMatters, Remix Magazine, Soul Shine Magazine and other media.

Track listing
Disc one
 Mark Otten – "Tranquility" – (7:10)
 Solid Globe – "Sahara" – (5:48)
 Whirlpool – "Under the Sun" (Solarstone Remix) – (7:18)
 Three Drives – "Signs from the Universe" – (4:14)
 Airwave – "Ladyblue" (Original beat) – (5:53)
 Kyau vs. Albert – "Velvet Morning" (Aalto Remix) – (5:01)
 Fictivision vs. Phynn – "Escape" (Phynn Mix) – (5:36)
 Perpetuous Dreamer – "Future Funland" (Astura Remix) – (5:00)
 Active Sight – "The Search for Freedom" – (6:01)
 Super8 – Alba – (6:00)
 *OceanLab – "Satellite" (Original Above & Beyond Remix) – (5:45)
 Robert Nickson – "Spiral" – (6:54)
 Armin van Buuren featuring Justine Suissa – "Burned With Desire" (Rising Star Mix) – (7:07)

Disc two
 Perry O'Neil – "Kubik" – (8:06)
 Valentino – "Flying" (Sultan and The Greek Remix) – (5:37) 
 Michael Burns – "The Ambience" – (4:35)
 Peter Martin presents Anthanasia – "Perfect Wave" – (6:43)
 St. John vs. Locust – "Mind Circles" (Perry O'Neil Remix) – (4:47)
 Remy and Roland Klinkenberg – "Fearless" – (5:42)
 Solarstone vs. Scott Bond – "Naked Angel" – (6:07)
 M.I.K.E. presents Fascinated – "Totally Fascinated" – (6:18)
 Mono – "Rise" – (5:37)
 *Envio – "Time To Say Goodbye" (Passiva Mix) – (6:04)
 True Form – "Forbidden Colours" – (7:28)
 Arctic Quest – "Offbeat" – (5:31)
 *Terry Bones vs. Fred Baker presents Water Planet – "Introspection" (John Askew Mix) – (5:06)

References

Armin van Buuren compilation albums
Electronic compilation albums
2004 compilation albums